Harold William Frank Taylor (27 December 1909 – 26 August 1990) was an English cricketer.  Taylor was a right-handed batsman.  He was born at Chesterton, Cambridgeshire.

Taylor played most of his cricket for Cambridgeshire in the Minor Counties Championship, where he made his debut for the county against the Surrey Second XI in 1925.  From 1925 to 1956, he represented the county in 76 matches, with his final appearance coming against Hertfordshire.

Taylor also played first-class cricket, where he represented a combined Minor Counties team in 2 first-class matches against Oxford University and the touring Indians, both in 1939. In his 2 first-class matches, he scored 58 runs at a batting average of 29.00, with a high score of 38.

Taylor died at Cambridge, Cambridgeshire on 26 August 1990.

References

External links
Harold Taylor at Cricinfo
Harold Taylor at CricketArchive

1909 births
1990 deaths
Sportspeople from Cambridge
English cricketers
Cambridgeshire cricketers
Minor Counties cricketers
People from Chesterton, Cambridge